Darnell Ernest Washington (born August 17, 2001) is an American football tight end for the Georgia Bulldogs. He was a two-time CFP national champion with the Bulldogs, winning in 2021 and 2022.

High school career 
Washington was born in Las Vegas, Nevada, on August 17, 2001. He attended Desert Pines High School, where he played football and basketball. A five-star recruit in football, he committed to play college football at the University of Georgia.

College career 
As a true freshman at Georgia, Darnell recorded 166 yards on seven receptions.

In Washington's second season he put up 145 yards on nine receptions and scored one touchdown. This touchdown was the first of Washington's career and it came in the SEC Championship Game against Alabama. Washington's longest gain of the season came on a 32 yard reception against Florida. He appeared in seven games and missed time due to having to have surgery for a minor fracture in his foot. In the 2022 College Football Playoff National Championship, Georgia defeated Alabama 33-18.

During Washington's third season, he recorded 28 receptions for 454 yards and two touchdowns. As a result, Washington was named to the Second-team All-SEC. On January 12, 2023, Washington declared for the 2023 NFL Draft.

References

External links 
 Georgia Bulldogs bio

Georgia Bulldogs football players
American football tight ends
Living people
2001 births
Players of American football from Nevada